Kamorta Island is an island in the Nicobar Islands chain of India, located in the northeast Indian Ocean between the Bay of Bengal and the Andaman Sea.

Facilities
INS Kardip is a naval forward operating base of the joint-services Andaman and Nicobar Command on Kamorta island. The Indian Navy's Kamorta-class Corvette is named after the island.

Demographics 
Kalatapu is the main village on this island. 
According to the 2011 census of India, The Island has 915 households.
List of villages from north to south and population:
Kakana, Nancowry, 265, 
Kakana South, 5, 
Neeche Tapu, 2, 
Pilpilow, 280, 
Vikas Nagar, 235, 
Karan, 5, 
Daring, 110, 
Maru, 0, 
Chanol, 13, 
Berainak, 188, 
Chota Inak, 239, 
Sanuh, 15, 
Banderkari, 23, 
Kalatapu, 1870, 
Ramzoo, 98, 
Tomae, 10, 
Changua, 136, 
Munak, 117, 
Payuha, 24, 
Knot, 9, 
Alukian, 46,

Administration
The island belongs to the township of Nancowry.

Image gallery

References 

Islands of the Andaman and Nicobar Islands
Nicobar district
Nicobar Islands
Islands of India
Populated places in India
Islands of the Bay of Bengal